Oronzio Maldarelli was an American sculptor and painter (1892–1963) born in Naples, Italy.

Education
He was born on September 9, 1892 and immigrated with his parents, Michael Maldarelli, a goldsmith, and mother, Louisa Rizzo Maldarelli, to the United States in 1901. About 1906 he began taking modeling lessons at the Cooper Union, and after two years began to study at the National Academy of Design with Leon Kroll, Ivan Olinsky, and Hermon Atkins MacNeil. In 1912 he entered the Beaux-Arts Institute of Design, where he studied under Jo Davidson, Elie Nadelman, John Gregory and others.

Career
Maldarelli's classical training allowed him to obtain commissions for both garden decorations and architectural sculpture.  However as he grew older his work became more and more abstracted, though it would remain basically figurative.

He taught at both Sarah Lawrence College and Columbia University.  One known student, Mario Cooper, would go on to considerable fame as an illustrator and also would teach at Columbia. Maldarelli died in New York City in 1963 at the age of 70 from a heart attack.

Like many other sculptors of his day Maldarelli produced both architectural and funerary sculpture.

He was a member of the National Sculpture Society and the National Academy of Design, and was awarded the Widener Gold Medal from the Pennsylvania Academy of Fine Arts.

Collections

St Louis Art Museum, St Louis, Missouri
Fogg Art Museum, Harvard University, Cambridge, Massachusetts
Smithsonian American Art Museum, Washington D.C.
Smithsonian Institution Hirshhorn Museum and Sculpture Garden, Washington D.C.
Whitney Museum of American Art, New York City
Pennsylvania Academy of Fine Arts, Philadelphia, Pennsylvania
Virginia Museum of Fine Arts, Richmond, Virginia
Metropolitan Museum of Art, New York City
Art Institute of Chicago, Chicago, Illinois
Newark Museum, Newark, New Jersey
St. Patrick's Cathedral, New York City

References

Contemporary American Sculpture, The California Palace of the Legion of Honor, Lincoln Park, San Francisco, The National Sculpture Society  1929
Opitz, Glenn B, Editor, Mantle Fielding’s Dictionary of American Painters, Sculptors & Engravers,  Apollo Book, Poughkeepsie NY, 1986
Proske, Beatrice Gilman, Brookgreen Gardens Sculpture,  Brookgreen Gardens, South Carolina, 1968

1892 births
1963 deaths
Italian emigrants to the United States
20th-century American sculptors
20th-century American male artists
American male sculptors
National Sculpture Society members
Sculptors Guild members
Beaux-Arts Institute of Design (New York City) alumni